

Current shows

Seasonal shows and Game Broadcasts
 ESPN Radio College GameDay
 College Football on ESPN Radio (2000–present)
 Saturday afternoon games (ACC, Big 12 and the SEC programs only)
 Saturday Night Football on ABC games only 
 Major bowl games
 BCS National Championship (2000–2013)
 College Football Playoff semifinal (2014–present)
 College Football Playoff National Championship (2014–present)
 NFL on ESPN Radio (simulcast on television on ESPN2 as Football Sunday)
 NBA on ESPN Radio (1996–present)
 Wednesday and Friday night doubleheader games on a weekly basis
 NBA Saturday Primetime on ABC games
 Christmas doubleheader games
 MLK Day games
 NBA All-Star Weekend festivities 
 NBA Playoffs
 Eastern Conference (even-numbered years)
 Western Conference (odd-numbered years)
 NBA Finals
 Major League Baseball on ESPN Radio (1998–present)
 Opening Night games
 Saturday night games of the week
 Sunday Night Baseball games
 Jackie Robinson Day games
 Little League Classic games
 MLB at Field of Dreams games
 Memorial Day, Juneteenth, Independence Day and Labor Day games
 MLB All-Star Weekend festivities including the Home Run Derby and All-Star Game
 MLB postseason
 American League (odd-numbered years)
 National League (even-numbered years)
 World Series
 Operation Football
 Countdown to Kickoff
 Football Frenzy
 NBA Insiders
 Baseball Tonight

ESPN Radio programs